Whetstone  is a place in the London Borough of Barnet, bearing the postcode N20. It is to the east of Totteridge, and these areas are known together as Totteridge and Whetstone. Whetstone is around 8 miles North of Charing Cross, is in the county of Greater London and historically was in Middlesex. The combined areas of Totteridge and Whetstone was, at the outset of the 21st century, found to be the 63rd-richest of the more than 9,000 wards of the United Kingdom.

The High Road is the A1000, formerly known as the Great North Road, parts of it still bear this name. Until the late 19th century its tiny developed area was one of two main settlements in the ancient parish of Friern Barnet, the other being Colney Hatch. It was thus the northernmost settlement in the Ossulstone hundred. Whetstone is also the northernmost part of the  parish of Finchley.

History

Early history
In medieval times the Hospitallers had a settlement nearby in Friern Barnet probably where Friary Park is now and alongside the old road to London. In 1340 the Bishop of London opened a gate into his park (the Highgate) which enabled a straight road across Finchley Common along the ridge there. The Hospitallers' settlement moved further west and became known as West Town, also known variously as "le Weston" (1398), "Wheston" (1417), and "Whetstonestret" (1439).

It the northernmost settlement in the Ossulstone hundred.

Until the late 19th century its tiny developed area was one of two main settlements in the ancient parish of Friern Barnet, the other being Colney Hatch.  Friern Barnet remained its ecclesiastical parish and its civil form was at that time giving way to urban and rural districts, in this case Friern Barnet Urban District.

The Whetstone

John Heathfield of the Friern Barnet & District Local History Society writes that according to the Royal Commission on the Historical Monuments of England, the stone outside The Griffin public house commonly known as the Whetstone, is a mounting block, and if so "it would have been connected to the toll gate erected by the Whetstone & Highgate Turnpike Trust about 1730."

An historic legend regarding the whetstone itself tells that the stone was used by soldiers on their march towards High Barnet (approx. 3.5 miles North of Whetstone) in preparation for the battle of Barnet in 1471.

He also states that the earliest evidence for the existence of the stone is a photograph taken in 1861 which shows it much closer to The Griffin than it is now. The stone was moved to its present location when the toll gate was removed in 1863.

The very rural parish until then had one other main population centre, equally a hamlet, Colney Hatch.

Transport in Whetstone

Whetstone is a unique area in North London by virtue of its extensive transport links with a national rail station on the Welwyn Garden City branch of the Thameslink network(Oakleigh Park Station, approx. 1 mile East of Whetstone high road), a TFL London underground station (Totteridge and Whetstone) and numerous TFL buses headed towards Walthamstow, Highbury, High Barnet, Brent Cross, Arnos Grove, Highgate, Muswell Hill, Edgeware, Winchmore Hill, Trafalgar Square and Colindale.

Buses that serve Whetstone include the 125 from Winchmore Hill to Colindale, the 263 from Barnet Hospital to Highbury Barn, the 383 from High Barnet to Finchley Memorial Hospital via Friary Park, the 34 from Walthamstow to Barnet Church, the 251 from Arnos Grove to Edgeware, the 326 from Brent Cross to High Barnet and the N20 from High Barnet to Trafalgar Square.

Geography 
Whetstone is the northernmost part of the Finchley plateau. Whetstone, formerly part of the Finchley Constituency, was represented in Parliament by former Prime Minister, Margaret Thatcher.

Nearby Parks 
 Swan Lane Park N12/N20
 Dollis Valley Green Walk from Moat Mount to Hampstead Heath extension via Finchley
 Friary Park N20/N12/N11

Transport
Stations in the area are:
 Totteridge and Whetstone Station (Northern line)

See also
Green Man, Whetstone

References

External links 

 
Areas of London
Districts of the London Borough of Barnet
Places formerly in Middlesex
Finchley
District centres of London